Housefull 4 is a 2019 Indian Hindi-language fantasy action comedy film directed by Farhad Samji and produced by Nadiadwala Grandson Entertainment and Fox Star Studios. The film is the fourth installment of Housefull franchise, and stars a cast of Akshay Kumar, Riteish Deshmukh, Bobby Deol, Kriti Sanon, Pooja Hegde and Kriti Kharbanda in the lead roles. The plot deals with reincarnation, Three brothers are set to marry three sisters. However, a peek into the distant past reveals to one of the brothers that their brides have been mixed up in their current reincarnation.

The film was half directed by Sajid Khan, who had also directed the first two installments, but was replaced by Farhad Samji midway during the shooting, due to Me Too allegations. Nadiadwala claimed the film to be the highest-budgeted Indian comedy film.

The film was theatrically released in India on 25 October 2019 during the occasion of Diwali and received mixed to negative reviews, with praise directed towards Kumar's performance, visual effects and production values, but criticism towards it's dialogues, storyline, music and direction. Although film became a major commercial success by grossing almost 300 crores worldwide. It went on to become the 4th highest grosser of 2019 and the 49th highest grossing Indian film of all time.

Plot 
The story of the film is based on reincarnation, and spans a period of 600 years from 1419 to 2019.

Harry, Max and Roy are three brothers who live in London. Harry, a barber gets frequent bizarre flashes of a past era. His forgetful nature causes him to misplace a don Michael's bag of 5 million pounds whose henchman demands them to return the money. To fulfill this, Harry, Roy, and Max get engaged to Pooja, Neha and Kriti, the 3 respective daughters of rich businessman Manraj Thakral. But soon all of the 3 trios fall in love, and their wedding preparations begin.

Soon circumstances cause the wedding to be in Sitamgarh. There all of them meet Aakhri Pasta, a bellboy at their hotel who recognizes them as reincarnated people of 600 years ago in 1419. Harry realizes his flashes have a connection with Pasta's claims, and gets to know the past from him in Madhavgarh.

In 1419, Madhavgarh's Rajkumar Bala was banished by his father Maharaj Parikshitap for trying to kill him to become king. His servant Pehla Pasta took him to Sitamgarh (then a kingdom) whose king Surya Singh Rana wanted grooms for his daughters. Bala planned to marry the eldest Madhu to become Maharaj and meets Bangdu, an effeminate dance teacher who's dating the second daughter Mala. Meena, the youngest loves her brave bodyguard Dharamputra. Bala helps them to be together and also they get him and Madhu united. The plan works as Surya announces their weddings, but his nephew Suryabhan who wants the throne kills Sitamgarh's enemy clan leader and frames the couples for it. The leader's brother Gama fights for revenge. Bala realizes he truly loves Madhu. The wedding mandap collapses and kills the couples and Gama.
 
Back in present, Harry realizes the grooms are set to marry the wrong brides. Pasta helps Harry remind Roy and Max of their previous lives. Pappu Rangeela, a qawwali singer and Gama's reincarnation, enters but has no recollection of his past. Pasta finds a painting of their past lives' wedding day, which shows Madhu-Bala, Mala-Bangdu and Meena-Dharamputra to make the girls remember their past. Before they can show painting to the girls, it is caught by Pappu, who remembers his life as Gama and crashes the wedding, leading Pooja and Neha to remember everything. Michael, in fact Suryabhan's reincarnation, shows up at wedding for his money and shoots Gama.

Kriti remembers everything when she sees Michael and also reveals the mandap hadn't collapsed - Suryabhan broke it down to kill everyone so he could be the Maharaj. Michael recounts his past and boasts how he killed Gama's brother. Pappu hears this and pushes Michael into the collapsing mandap, thus bringing his revenge. The film ends on a happy note as Harry-Kriti, Roy-Pooja and Max-Neha get married, thus completing their 600-year-old love story.

Cast
 Akshay Kumar as Rajkumar Bala Dev Singh/Harsh "Harry" Sinha (dual role)
 Bobby Deol as Dharamputra Singh Mahabali and Madhav “Max” Sinha (dual role)
 Riteish Deshmukh as Bangdu Pratap Singh a.k.a. Bangdu Maharaj and Raman “Roy” Sinha (dual role)
 Kriti Sanon as Rajkumari Madhu and Kriti Thakral (dual role)
 Pooja Hegde as Rajkumari Mala and Pooja Thakral (dual role)
 Kriti Kharbanda as Rajkumari Meena and Neha Thakral (dual role)
 Rana Daggubati as Raja Gama Chandrendar/Ashish "Pappu" Rangeela (dual role)
 Chunky Pandey as Pehla Pasta and Aakhri Pasta
 Ranjeet Bedi as Maharaja Suryadev "Surya" Singh Rana and Manraj Thakral
 Sharad Kelkar as Suryabhan and Gangster Michael D'Costa
 Johnny Lever as Winston Churchgate and Giggly
 Jamie Lever as Giggly: Madhu, Mala and Meena's servant
 Nawazuddin Siddiqui as Dharmesh Ramsey a.k.a. Ramsey Baba (special appearance)
 Manoj Pahwa as Viraj Sehni a.k.a. Big Bhai (special appearance)
 Parikshit Sahni as Maharaja Parikshitap Dev Singh (special appearance)
 Archana Puran Singh as Varsha Sinha (photo only)
 Shakti Kapoor as Prabhakar Sinha (photo only)
 Sham Mashalkar as Darbari
 Prithvi Zutshi as Shekhar Siskeria
 Saurabh Sachdeva as Raazdaar
 Saurabh Srivastava as Lakhan
 Jitendra Bamgude as a Goon

Release
The film was theatrically released in India on 25 October 2019 during the Diwali festival along with Vijay starrer Bigil and Karthi-starrer Kaithi.

Reception

Box office
Housefull 4s opening day domestic collection was 16.50 crore. On the second day, the film collected 17.00 crore. On the third day, the film collected 13.00 crore, taking total opening weekend collection to 46.50 crore.

, with a gross of 245 crore in India and 51 crore overseas, the film has a worldwide gross collection of 296 crore and is the  7th highest-grossing Hindi film of 2019.

Critical response 
Komal Nahta of Film Information said, "Housefull 4 is not a very entertaining fare and has ordinary merits. On the one hand is the festival period which will work in its favour and on the other hand is the word of mouth which will work against its interests." Sreeparna Sengupta of The Times of India, giving two and half stars out of five, noted that due to general silliness, there were mindless comic moments and scenes of low-brow humour in the film. She opined that it was a drag in portions and jokes were stale. She concluded, "Overall, Housefull 4 ends up as a complete mad caper. Which, if you're a fan of the Housefull brand of comedy, might appeal to you. But if you are not, then proceed with caution. Trade analyst and critic Taran Adarsh gave the film one and half stars out of five and called it as "disappointing". Criticising writing, direction and over the top performances, he noted that it is the weakest film in Housefull franchise, which failed to make audience laugh.

Soundtrack 

The film's music is composed by Sohail Sen, Farhad Samji and  Sandeep Shirodkar, with lyrics written by Farhad Samji, Sameer Anjaan and Vayu.

"Bhoot Raja Bahar Aaja" composed by Laxmikant–Pyarelal sung by Asha Bhosle from the 1977 movie Chacha Bhatija was recreated as "The Bhoot Song". Also, the music of the song was remixed from the song "Ammadu let's do Kummudu" composed by Devi Sri Prasad of the film Khaidi No. 150.

Bala Bala by Tony Montana Music was recreated as Shaitan Ka Saala. The makers of the film officially got the rights to remake the original song after six months.

Controversies
Director Sajid Khan was originally scheduled to direct the film; in October 2018, in the wake of the ongoing "Me Too" movement in India, Khan was accused by actresses Saloni Chopra, Rachel White and journalist Kma Upadhyay of sexual assault and misconduct. Following the accusations, Khan tweeted that he would step down as director, while lead actor Akshay Kumar tweeted that he was cancelling shooting for the film and that he would not work with the accused until the investigation was complete. Later on, Nana Patekar too left the production in the wake of allegations of inappropriate behaviour and touch alleged by victim Tanushree Dutta. Rana Daggubati stepped into essay the role which Nana was supposed to be playing.

Farhad Samji, who co-directed Housefull 3 replaced Sajid Khan as the director.

References

External links
 
 
Housefull 4 on Bollywood Hungama

2019 films
Indian historical comedy films
Films set in ancient India
2010s Hindi-language films
Films set in London
Films about reincarnation
Films shot in London
Films set in the 15th century
2010s historical comedy films
Films shot in Mumbai
Indian sequel films
2019 comedy films
Fox Star Studios films
Films directed by Farhad Samji